Do Not Disturb is a DeLuxe Color CinemaScope (1965) romantic comedy film directed by Ralph Levy and starring Doris Day and Rod Taylor as a married American couple living in England.

Plot
American couple Mike and Janet Harper move to England for Mike's work with a company that deals in textiles and fashions. Mike wants to live in a flat in the heart of London, but Janet instead finds a rural estate 30 miles outside London in Kent, and Mike must to commute into the city by train. For convenience, Mike often stays in a company's flat in London rather than returning to Kent, but his absence causes Janet to feel lonely and neglected.

Janet believes that Mike may be having an affair with his assistant Claire Hackett, and the Harpers' busybody landlady Vanessa Courtwright encourages Janet to play Mike's game by entering into an affair of her own, even if it is fake. However, the affair may become a reality when the suave Italian antiques dealer Paul Bellari arrives to decorate the house. Bellari whisks Janet off to Paris, where she manages to deflect his advances despite her inebriation after drinking champagne. Eventually, Paul and Janet learn that their suspicions were false and they reconcile with each other.

Cast
 Doris Day as Janet Harper
 Rod Taylor as Mike Harper
 Hermione Baddeley as Vanessa Courtwright
 Sergio Fantoni as Paul Bellari
 Reginald Gardiner as George Simmons
 Maura McGiveney as Claire Hackett
  Aram Katcher as Culkos
 Leon Askin as Willie Langsdorf
 Lisa Perav as Alicia Petrova
 Michael Romanoff as Delegate
 Albert Carrier as Claude Reynard
 Barbara Morrison as Mrs. Ordley
 Dick Winslow as One-Man Band / Accordion Player
 Raquel Welch as Woman in lobby
 Britt Ekland as Party Girl

Production
George Marshall was recruited to replace original director Ralph Levy, who contracted a viral disease during filming. This change caused the film to finish behind schedule.

Reception
The film had admissions of 10,730 in France.

According to Fox records, the film needed to earn $7,300,000 in rentals to break even and made $5,275,000, meaning it made a loss.

Novelization
In advance of the film's release, as was the custom of the era, a paperback novelization of the film was published by Dell Books. The author was renowned crime and western novelist Marvin H. Albert, who had written other books related to films to coincide with their releases.

See also
List of American films of 1965

References

External links 
 
 
 
 

1965 films
1965 romantic comedy films
American romantic comedy films
Films set in England
Films directed by Ralph Levy
Films scored by Lionel Newman
20th Century Fox films
Adultery in films
1960s English-language films
1960s American films